Gawar-Bati or Narsati is an Indo-Aryan language spoken in the Chitral region of northern Pakistan, and across the border in Afghanistan. It is also known as Aranduyiwar in Chitral because it is spoken in Arandu, which is the last village in lower Chitral and is also across the border from Berkot in Afghanistan. There are about 9,000 speakers of Gawar-Bati, with 1,500 in Pakistan, and 7,500 in Afghanistan. The name Gawar-Bati means "speech of the Gawar", a people detailed by the Cacopardos in their study of the Hindu Kush.

Study and classification 
The Gawar-Bati language has not been given serious study by linguists, except that it is mentioned by George Morgenstierne (1926) and Kendall Decker (1992).

It is classified as an Indo-Aryan language of the Dardic subgroup. However, the term Dardic is not linguistic but merely geographic.

Phonology

The following tables set out the phonology of the Gawar-Bati language:

Vowels

The status of short /e/ and /o/ is unclear.

Consonants

A breathy voiced series, /bʱ dʱ gʱ/, existed recently in older speakers—and may still do so.

Orthography
It is rarely written. This alphabet is used in Pakistan:

Notes and references

Further reading 
 Decker, Kendall D. (1992) Languages of Chitral  Islamabad, Pakistan: National Institute of Pakistan Studies, Quaid-i-Azam University,  http://www.ethnologue.com/show_work.asp?id=32850
 Morgenstierne, Georg (1926) Report on a Linguistic Mission to Afghanistan Instituttet for Sammenlignende Kulturforskning, Serie C I-2. Oslo.

External links
 Georg Morgenstierne multimedia database
 Gawar-Bati online keyboard

Dardic languages
Languages of Chitral
Languages of Khyber Pakhtunkhwa